Juan Francisco Muhlethaler  (born 17 December 1954, in Canelones) is a former Uruguayan footballer who played for clubs in Uruguay, including Montevideo Wanderers and Rampla Juniors.

Muhlethaler received six caps for the senior Uruguay national football team, scoring once.

References

1954 births
Living people
Uruguayan people of Swiss descent
People from Canelones Department
Uruguayan footballers
Uruguay international footballers
1983 Copa América players
Uruguayan Primera División players
Montevideo Wanderers F.C. players
Rampla Juniors players
Copa América-winning players
Association football forwards